Krang is a Teenage Mutant Ninja Turtles supervillain.

Krang may also refer to:

Krang (band), a Dutch band
Krang (Marvel Comics), a Marvel Comics character
Krang a species of bipedal feline warriors, who occasionally opposed Sheriff Bravestarr, and his cohorts on New Texas
The Tar-Aiym Krang from the book of the same name by Alan Dean Foster

See also
Crang (disambiguation)